The following is a list of neighborhoods, districts, and other sections located in the city of Harrisburg, Pennsylvania. The list is organized by broader geographical sections within the city. While there is no official list of neighborhoods, districts, and places, this list was compiled from the sources listed in the References and External links sections, as well as from published information from secondary sources.

Common usage for Harrisburg's neighborhood names does not respect "official" borders used by the city's police, planning commission or other entities. Therefore, some of the places listed here may overlap geographically, and residents do not always agree where one neighborhood ends and another begins. Some names are past neighborhoods or developments that no longer exist (such as "Hardscrabble").

Historically, neighborhood development has followed ward boundaries, but many neighborhoods and historic districts have been re-shaped by community leaders, the Harrisburg Architectural Review Board, and planning organizations in the post-industrial era.

Allison Hill

The Allison Hill district boundary includes Arsenal Boulevard and Herr Street to the north, 19th Street to the east, I-83 to the south, and the bluff along Cameron Street to the west.
Central Allison Hill
North Allison Hill
Sibletown (antiquated, now William Howard Day and M.W. Smith Homes)
South Allison Hill
Springdale (antiquated)
Summit Terrace

City Island

City Island is a mile-long island owned by the city in the Susquehanna River. There are no residences; the area is used for recreation and extra city vehicle equipment storage.

Downtown

The boundary of Harrisburg's Downtown is considered Forster Street to the north, I-83 to the south, the railroad tracks to the east, and the Susquehanna River to the west.
Bull Run (antiquated)
Capitol District
Eighth Ward (antiquated)
Judytown (antiquated)
Market Square
Maclaysburg (antiquated)
Restaurant Row
Shipoke
South of Market (SoMa)

East Harrisburg

The East Harrisburg district boundary includes Reservoir Park and Market Street to the north, the city line to the east, the railroad tracks to the south, and 18th Street to the west. Smaller rowhome neighborhoods and detached homes in Bellevue Park make up this area, in addition to commercial corridors along South 29th and Derry Streets, an industrial corridor adjacent to the railroad tracks, and larger institutional uses such as John Harris High School, the Marshall Math Science Academy, and the former Bishop McDevitt High School.
Bellevue Park

Midtown

The Midtown district boundary includes Maclay Street to the north, 7th Street to the east, Forster Street to the south, and Front Street to the west.
Capitol Heights
Cumberland Court
Engleton
Fox Ridge
Hardscrabble (antiquated, demolished)
Verbeketown (antiquated)

South Harrisburg

The South Harrisburg district boundary includes I-83 to the north, the city line to the south and east, and the Susquehanna River to the west.
Cloverly Heights
Frog Hollow (antiquated, demolished)
Hall Manor
Hoverton Homes
Lochiel (antiquated)
Sheesleytown (antiquated, demolished)

Uptown

The boundary of the Uptown district is the city limits to the north, 7th Street to the east, Maclay Street to the south, and Front Street to the west.
Academy Manor
Camp Curtin
Cottage Ridge (antiquated)
Curtin Heights (antiquated)
Landmark
Riverside
Schuddemageville (antiquated)

Historic Districts
6th Street Historic District
Allison Hill Historic District
Bellevue Park Historic District
Old Downtown Commercial Historic District
Fox Ridge Historic District
Historic Harrisburg Historic District
Old Midtown Historic District
Mount Pleasant Historic District
Pennsylvania Capitol Historic District
Olde Uptown Historic District

See also
Capital Area Greenbelt
Harrisburg Housing Authority
Pennsylvania State Capitol Complex

External links
City of Harrisburg, Center City Aerial Illustration
City of Harrisburg Visitors Guide to districts and neighborhoods

References

 
Harrisburg